Cham Kangari (also Romanized as Cham Kangarī) is a village in Kamfiruz-e Shomali Rural District, Kamfiruz District, Marvdasht County, Fars Province, Iran. At the 2006 census, its population was 294, in 71 families.

References 

Populated places in Marvdasht County